George Minatto Paulino (born 25 March 1991), commonly known as Georginho, is a Brazilian professional association football who last played for Beitar Jerusalem of the Israeli Premier League.

References

 

1991 births
Living people
Brazilian footballers
Criciúma Esporte Clube players
Capivariano Futebol Clube players
Bnei Sakhnin F.C. players
Beitar Jerusalem F.C. players
Israeli Premier League players
Expatriate footballers in Israel
Brazilian expatriate sportspeople in Israel
Association football midfielders